Thomas Jefferson Raub (December 1, 1870 – February 15, 1949) was a professional baseball player.  He was a catcher for parts of two seasons (1903, 1906) with the Chicago Cubs and St. Louis Cardinals.  For his career, he compiled a .253 batting average in 162 at-bats, with nine runs batted in.

He was born in Raubsville, Pennsylvania and died in Phillipsburg, New Jersey at the age of 78.

External links

1870 births
1949 deaths
Chicago Cubs players
St. Louis Cardinals players
Major League Baseball catchers
Baseball players from Pennsylvania
Allentown Kelly's Killers players
Montreal Royals players
Toronto Maple Leafs (International League) players
Lancaster Red Roses players
Birmingham Barons players
Wilkes-Barre Barons (baseball) players
Johnstown Johnnies players
York White Roses players